Beatrice Akello Akori is a Ugandan politician. She is a woman member of parliament in the eleventh Parliament of Uganda (2021–26), serving as a member of the ruling National Resistance Movement party.

Career
Beatrice Akello Akori was the Resident District Commissioner for Apac District. In 2020 she also chaired the Apac District taskforce for COVID-19.

In the 2021 general election, she was elected as a woman representative in parliament for Agago district. She received 31,450 votes to beat the previous woman MP for Agago, Judith Franca Akello (FDC), who received 26,564 votes.

In 2022 she was appointed Minister of State for Economic Monitoring in the Cabinet of Uganda.

See also 
 List of members of the eleventh Parliament of Uganda.
Agago District.
Apac District
National Resistance Movement
Parliament of Uganda.
Member of Parliament.

External links 

 Website of the Parliament of Uganda.

References

Living people
Ugandan Roman Catholics
Year of birth missing (living people)
Place of birth missing (living people)
21st-century Ugandan women politicians
21st-century Ugandan politicians
National Resistance Movement politicians
Women members of the Parliament of Uganda
Members of the Parliament of Uganda

Government ministers of Uganda
Women government ministers of Uganda